Srb's anomaly is the clinical condition describing synostosis, or fusion, between the first and second ribs. It may be either a partial or complete fusion between the two ribs to create an entirely indistinguishable new rib.

Srb's anomaly is commonly seen in people with Klippel–Feil syndrome.

References

Syndromes